Minuscule 2423 (in the Gregory-Aland numbering), is a Greek minuscule manuscript of the New Testament, on 227 parchment leaves (20.2 cm by 15 cm); it is dated paleographically to the 13th century.

Description 
The codex contains the text of the Acts of the Apostles, Catholic epistles, Pauline epistles with some lacunae. Epistle to the Hebrews is placed between 2 Thessalonians and 1 Timothy.

The text is written in one column per page, in 27 lines per page.

Text 

The Greek text of the codex is a representative of the Byzantine text-type. Aland placed it in Category V.

History 

The codex now is located in the Kenneth Willis Clark Collection of the Duke University (Gk MS 3)  at Durham.

See also 

 List of New Testament minuscules
 Textual criticism

References

Further reading 

 K. W. Clark, Eight American Praxapostoloi (Chicago, 1941).

External links 

 Minuscule 2423 at the Kenneth Willis Clark Collection of Greek Manuscripts

Greek New Testament minuscules
13th-century biblical manuscripts
Duke University Libraries